Ariel Mauricio Flores Gómez (born February 10, 1977) is a Mexican sport shooter. He won a bronze medal in men's skeet shooting at the 2007 Pan American Games in Rio de Janeiro, Brazil, and gold at the 2008 ISSF World Cup series in Kerrville, Texas, accumulating scores of 144 and 147 targets, respectively.

Flores represented Mexico at the 2008 Summer Olympics in Beijing, where he competed in the men's skeet shooting. He finished only in twenty-seventh place by one point behind Guatemala's Juan Carlos Romero from the final attempt, for a total score of 111 targets.

References

External links
NBC Olympics Profile

1977 births
Living people
Mexican male sport shooters
Skeet shooters
Olympic shooters of Mexico
Shooters at the 2008 Summer Olympics
Shooters at the 2007 Pan American Games
People from Ciudad Victoria
Pan American Games bronze medalists for Mexico
Pan American Games medalists in shooting
Medalists at the 2007 Pan American Games
21st-century Mexican people